Breaking Vases: Shattering Limitations & Daring to Thrive is a memoir by Dima Ghawi.

Overview
Growing up in a small Christian community in Jordan, Dima Ghawi was taught to be quiet and subservient to her elders and men, values ingrained my her conservative upbringing. At the age of five, Dima’s beloved grandmother cautioned the young girl that a woman’s main responsibility was to preserve her image — something as fragile as a glass vase — as well as the honor of her family’s reputation. Anything less would be shameful. However, Dima’s grandmother also planted a seed: the hope that Dima could attend a formal university and become the first college-educated woman in her family.

At nineteen, struggling to free herself from cultural constraints and her father’s temper, Dima entered a traditional engagement with an older, affluent, and seemingly Western-minded jeweler. Newly married, she eagerly uprooted her life in Jordan and moved with him to San Diego.

However, California’s “Little Middle East” was a jarring contrast to her American Dream. To Dima’s surprise, her husband was much more traditional and controlling than she had imagined. Escaping these circumstances would be dangerous and require more courage than Dima had ever known before. Regardless, she was determined to transform her own destiny, even if it meant standing alone and facing life-threatening consequences.

Reception 

Shortly after publication, Breaking Vases was recognized as the 2018 Writer’s Digest Grand Prize Winner, a Best Indie Book Award Winner, Readers' Favorite Book Award Winner, National Indie Excellence Awards Winner, and a Nautilus Book Awards Winner.

References

External links 
 
 Author's Website

American memoirs
2018 non-fiction books